François Rancy is the Director of the ITU Radiocommunication Bureau, the permanent secretariat of the International Telecommunication Union Radiocommunication Sector (ITU-R). Rancy was elected at the 2010 Plenipotentiary Conference in Guadalajara, Mexico, with the term beginning on January 1, 2011. At the 2014 ITU Plenipotentiary Conference Busan, Rancy was elected to a second term.

References 

International Telecommunication Union people
Living people
Year of birth missing (living people)